Melvin Metcalfe Sr. (November 1, 1911 – May 11, 1977) was an American sound engineer. He won an Oscar for Best Sound for the film Earthquake.

Selected filmography
 Earthquake (1974; co-won with Ronald Pierce)

References

External links

1911 births
1977 deaths
American audio engineers
Best Sound Mixing Academy Award winners
People from New York (state)
20th-century American engineers